The Neosho River Bridge, near Hartford, Kansas, was built in 1926.  It was listed on the National Register of Historic Places in 1983.  

The bridge design was the work of James Barney Marsh.  This example is just one of 72 rainbow arch bridges built in Kansas, but was assessed to have a good chance of survival due to its relatively obscure location.

References

Bridges in Kansas
National Register of Historic Places in Coffey County, Kansas
Bridges completed in 1926